Leudeville is a commune in the Essonne department in Île-de-France in northern France.

Inhabitants of Leudeville are known as Leudevillois.

See also
 Communes of the Essonne department

References

External links

Official website 

Mayors of Essonne Association 

Communes of Essonne